Binia Feltscher (born 13 October 1978 in Chur) is a Swiss retired curler from Flims. She was the skip of the 2014 and 2016 World championship curling teams from Switzerland. From 2006 to 2013 she was known as Binia Feltscher-Beeli.

Career
Feltscher began curling in 1989 and started skipping in 2007. Feltscher was the third of the Swiss team skipped by Mirjam Ott at the 2006 Winter Olympics, where she won a silver medal. With Ott, Feltscher won silver medals at the European Curling Championships in 2004 and 2005 and a bronze in 2006. Team Ott represented Switzerland at the 2005 World Women's Curling Championship and finished eighth with a 4–7 record. Feltscher left the Ott rink in 2007 to form her own team. She won another silver medal at the European Championships in 2009. Her second trip to the World Championships was in 2010 where she skipped the Swiss rink to a 3–8 record.

Binia won her first World Curling Tour event in 2013 at the Glynhill Ladies International. She also won the Karuizawa International that season as well.

The 2013–14 season was a breakthrough year for Feltscher and teammates Irene Schori, Franziska Kaufmann and Christine Urech. At the start of the season, the won the 2013 Red Deer Curling Classic and made the playoffs of the Stockholm Ladies Cup and the Women's Masters Basel. They also won the right to represent Switzerland at the 2014 World Women's Curling Championship in Saint John, New Brunswick. They had a great round robin, finishing in second with a 9–2 record, only losing to South Korea and Russia. This sent her to the 1 vs 2 game against Canada's Rachel Homan which she would lose 8–3. They quickly rebounded in the semifinal against Korea's Kim Ji-sun setting up a rematch against Homan. After a slow first half, the Swiss team would score three points in the eighth end and steal three in the ninth, giving them a 9–5 lead going into the final end. They successfully ran the Canadians out of stones to secure Switzerland's fourth World Championship title.

The following season, Team Feltscher won the 2014 European Curling Championships by defeating Anna Sidorova in the final. They also played in three Grand Slam of Curling events, the first time playing in one for Feltscher. They qualified at both the 2014 Masters and the 2014 Canadian Open. They did not get to defend their title as World Champions, finishing 4–6 at the 2015 Swiss Women's Curling Championship. The 2015–16 season started slow for the Swiss rink, only qualifying in three events at the start including winning the 2015 International ZO Women's Tournament. Things changed however when they won the Swiss championship and were back at the World Championships. They finished the round robin of the 2016 World Women's Curling Championship once again with a 9–2 but this time in first place, giving them hammer and choice of stones in the 1 vs 2 game. They defeated Japan's Satsuki Fujisawa to advance to the final where they would once again play the Japanese rink. Up 7–6 in the last end, they forced Fujisawa to draw for one to tie the game but she was to heavy, giving Feltscher and her team their second World Women's Curling Championship gold medal and title. The team ended their season by winning the 2016 Euronics European Masters.

Team Feltscher won the right to represent Switzerland at the 2016 European Curling Championships but they did not qualify. They made the semifinal of the 2016 WFG Masters and finished second at the Swiss championship. The next season, they were able to win the Swiss playdowns, sending Feltscher to yet another World Women's Curling Championship. She couldn't win three in a row as the team struggled throughout the week, posting a 5–7 record. At the conclusion of the 2017–18 season, Irene Schori and Franziska Kaufmann left the team and were replaced by Stefanie Berset and Larissa Hari. The team almost made it to the World Championships that season, but were bested by Silvana Tirinzoni 8–7 in the final.

Team Feltscher had a slow start to the 2019–20 season, failing to make the playoffs in their first four events. They played in just one slam event, the 2019 Tour Challenge Tier 2 and lost in the quarterfinals. The Feltscher rink finished third at both the 2019 Changan Ford International Curling Elite and the Schweizer Cup. They picked it up in the second half of the season however, qualifying in every event. They placed third at the 2020 Swiss Women's Curling Championship. After the season ended, Feltscher announced her retirement from competitive curling.

Personal life
Feltscher is married and has two children.

Teams

Grand Slam record

References

External links

1978 births
Living people
Swiss female curlers
Curlers at the 2006 Winter Olympics
Olympic silver medalists for Switzerland
Olympic curlers of Switzerland
Olympic medalists in curling
Medalists at the 2006 Winter Olympics
World curling champions
People from Chur
People from Imboden District
Continental Cup of Curling participants
European curling champions
Sportspeople from Graubünden